David Antonowicz (born 1 June 1980) is an Australian rules footballer who played three games for West Coast in the Australian Football League in 2000. Originally recruited from the Western Jets, Antonowicz struggled to gain a place in the Eagles side and spent most of his time playing in the West Australian Football League with Subiaco, Claremont and East Perth.  He currently plays for Melton South in the Ballarat Football League

References

External links
 
 WAFL Playing statistics

West Coast Eagles players
Subiaco Football Club players
Claremont Football Club players
East Perth Football Club players
Living people
1980 births
Australian rules footballers from Victoria (Australia)
Western Jets players